Harland Ah You (born February 26, 1972) is a former gridiron football defensive lineman who played 10 games with the Calgary Stampeders of the Canadian Football League in 1998. He played college football at Brigham Young University and attended Kahuku High & Intermediate School in Kahuku, Hawaii.

He is the son of former Montreal Alouette Junior Ah You.

References

External links
Just Sports Stats

1972 births
American sportspeople of Chinese descent
American sportspeople of Samoan descent
Players of American football from Hawaii
American football defensive linemen
Canadian football defensive linemen
Players of Canadian football from Hawaii
BYU Cougars football players
Calgary Stampeders players
People from Honolulu County, Hawaii
Living people
Hawaii people of Chinese descent